Utica Public Library is a historic library building located in Utica in Oneida County, New York. It is a rectangular five story Neoclassical style structure, constructed of New Haven brick on a limestone foundation.  It features a central pedimented pavilion with Corinthian order columns.  It was designed in 1903 by Arthur C. Jackson of Carrère and Hastings.

It was listed on the National Register of Historic Places in 1982.

Originally the Utica Public Library sat at the Broad Street offices of Attorney Justus Rathbone in 1825. In 1842 the library had 1,700 volumes. It then reached 4,000 volumes in 1865. In 1904 more than 25,000 books from Elizabeth Street were transferred to the library. In February 2004, the computer room was opened.

References

External links
Utica Public Library website

Library buildings completed in 1903
Libraries on the National Register of Historic Places in New York (state)
Neoclassical architecture in New York (state)
Buildings and structures in Utica, New York
National Register of Historic Places in Oneida County, New York